Luppi is a surname, and may refer to:

 Daniele Luppi (born 1972), Italian musician
 Davide Luppi (born 1990), Italian footballer
 Ermenegildo Luppi (1877–1937), Italian sculptor
 Federico Luppi (1936–2017), Argentinian actor
 Jacopo Luppi (born 1992), Italian footballer
 Luppi (Bleach), a fictional character in Bleach